The Indianapolis Public Schools Athletic Conference was an athletic conference consisting of high schools in the Indianapolis Public Schools district. The demise of the conference came in 2018, as four of the seven remaining schools closed in a span of two years, leaving only three schools left, one of which (Howe) is a charter school, and another (Manual) under state control (IPS has stated those two schools will close if returned to school board control). Instead, those two schools joined the Greater Indianapolis Conference, leaving George Washington as an independent.

Membership

 Shortridge was closed as a high school between 1981 and 2009. When it reopened as a magnet school, instead of joining the IPS conference, the school joined the Pioneer Conference along with Attucks due to their smaller enrollments and specialized programs compared to other IPS schools.
 Howe and Washington were closed as high schools from 1995 to 2003.
 Washington played in the SCC from 1937 to 1943.
 Marshall was closed as a high school from 1986 to 2009, then reopened.

References

External links
Conference Membership
IHSAA
Indianapolis Public Schools Website

Education in Indianapolis
Indiana high school athletic conferences
Education in Marion County, Indiana
Public